Sir John Anthony Hardy  (born 9 November 1954) is a human geneticist and molecular biologist at the Reta Lila Weston Institute of Neurological Studies at University College London with research interests in neurological diseases.

Education
Hardy attended St Ambrose College in the late 1960s, where his interest in biochemistry was encouraged by his Biology teacher, Mrs Cox. He received his Bachelor of Science degree from the University of Leeds in 1976 and his PhD from Imperial College London in 1981 for research on dopamine and amino acid neuropharmacology.

Career and research
Following his PhD, Hardy did postdoctoral research at the MRC Neuropathogenesis Unit in Newcastle upon Tyne, England and then further postdoctoral work at the Swedish Brain Bank in Umeå, Sweden where he started to work on Alzheimer's disease.

He became Assistant Professor of Biochemistry at St. Mary's Hospital, Imperial College London in 1985 and initiated genetic studies of Alzheimer's disease there. He became Associate Professor in 1989 and then took the Pfeiffer Endowed Chair of Alzheimer's Research at the University of South Florida, in Tampa in 1992. In 1996 he moved to Mayo Clinic in Jacksonville, Florida, as Consultant and Professor of Neuroscience.

He became Chair of Neuroscience in 2000 and moved to National Institute on Aging, Bethesda, Maryland, as Chief of the Laboratory of Neurogenetics in 2001. In 2007 he took up the Chair of Molecular Biology of Neurological Disease at the Reta Lila Weston Institute of Neurological Studies, University College London.

On 29 November 2015, he was awarded the Breakthrough Prize.

In 2018, Hardy, along with Christian Haass, Bart De Strooper and Michel Goedert, received the Brain Prize for "groundbreaking research on the genetic and molecular basis of Alzheimer’s disease."

Awards and honours
Among other awards and honours, Hardy has won the Breakthrough Prize in Life Sciences for dissecting the causes of Alzheimer's disease, Parkinson's disease and frontotemporal dementia; the MetLife prize for research into Alzheimer's disease, and the Potamkin Prize for his work in describing the first genetic mutations in the amyloid gene in Alzheimer's disease, in 1991. He was elected a Fellow of the Royal Society (FRS) in 2009. He was knighted in the 2022 New Year Honours for services to "human health in improving our understanding of dementia and neurodegenerative diseases".

2018 – The Brain Prize
2017 – Honorary Doctor of Science, Leeds University
2015 – Breakthrough Prize in Life Sciences
2015 – Member of the European Molecular Biology Organization (EMBO)
2014 – The Michael J. Fox Foundation award for Parkinson research
2014 – Thudichum Medal from the Biochemical Society
2014 – Dan David Prize
2011 – Elected Fellow of the Institute of Biology
2010 – Honorary Doctor of Science, Newcastle University
2009 – Elected Fellow of the Royal Society
 2008 – Honorary MD, Umeå University, Sweden, 
 2008 – Elected a Fellow of the Academy of Medical Sciences (FMedSci)
 2008 – Anne Marie Oprecht International Prize for Research in Parkinson's Disease
 2002 – Kaul Prize for Research into Alzheimer's disease
 1995 – Allied Signal Prize for Research into Aging
 1994 – Metlife Foundation Award for Medical Research in Alzheimer's Disease
 1993 – Potamkin Prize from the American Academy of Neurology, for Alzheimer's Research
 1992 – IPSEN Prize for Research into Alzheimer's Disease
 1991 – Peter Debje Prize, University of Limburg, Belgium, For Alzheimer's Research

References

1954 births
Living people
British geneticists
Fellows of the Royal Society
British molecular biologists
Alumni of the University of Leeds
Alumni of Imperial College London
Academics of Imperial College London
University of South Florida faculty
Academics of University College London
Members of the European Molecular Biology Organization
Human geneticists
Knights Bachelor
People educated at St. Ambrose College